Tallmansville is a small unincorporated community in Upshur County, West Virginia, United States.  The ZIP code of Tallmansville is 26237; its ZCTA had a population of 418 at the 2000 census.  The nearby community of Sago gained international notoriety on January 2, 2006 for the Sago Mine disaster, which killed 12 coal miners.

The community of Tallmansville received its name, honoring their first postmaster Benjamin Tallman, in 1869. According to the Geographic Names Information System, the town has also had the
toponyms Stroder and Strader Station in the past.

References

Unincorporated communities in Upshur County, West Virginia
Unincorporated communities in West Virginia